"Heaven in the Backseat" is a song by British rock band Romeo's Daughter that was featured on their self-titled debut album. It was made more popular when it was later featured on the soundtrack of the film A Nightmare on Elm Street 5: The Dream Child. The song stayed on the UK Singles Chart below the top 75 for two weeks and peaked at No. 97 on the week of 12 May 1990, becoming the band's only domestic hit.

Music video 
The video starts off with Romeo's Daughter performing at a concert, then Leigh Matty gets into a limo while singing and scenes are shown from A Nightmare on Elm Street 5: The Dream Child. She is then seen singing at another concert with more scenes from the film.

Cover 
It was covered by Eddie Money in 1991 from the album Right Here. His version reached No. 58 on the US Billboard Hot 100 Singles chart and it peaked at No. 6 on the US Mainstream Rock Chart.

Charts

References

External links 
 

1988 songs
1989 singles
Romeo's Daughter songs
Songs written by Robert John "Mutt" Lange
Song recordings produced by Robert John "Mutt" Lange
Jive Records singles